Gabriel Cano (born 23 May 1965) is a Mexican former cyclist. He competed in two events at the 1988 Summer Olympics.

References

External links
 

1965 births
Living people
Mexican male cyclists
Olympic cyclists of Mexico
Cyclists at the 1988 Summer Olympics
Place of birth missing (living people)
Pan American Games medalists in cycling
Pan American Games bronze medalists for Mexico
Medalists at the 1987 Pan American Games